Parliamentary elections were held in Nigeria on 4 July 1992, the first since the 1983 military coup. Only two parties were allowed to contest the elections, which resulted in a victory for the Social Democratic Party, which won 52 of the 91 Senate seats and 314 of the 593 House seats, despite the National Republican Convention winning more votes. Voter turnout was only 25%.

Results

Senate

House of Representatives

References

Nigeria
Nigeria
Parliamentary elections in Nigeria
Election and referendum articles with incomplete results
July 1992 events in Nigeria